The GiMA Best Film Album is given by Global Indian Music Academy as a part of its annual Global Indian Music Academy Awards.

List of winners
 2010 3 Idiots  – Shantanu Moitra
 2011 Dabangg – Sajid–Wajid, Lalit Pandit
 Anjaana Anjaani – Vishal–Shekhar
 Band Baaja Baaraat – Salim–Sulaiman
 Once Upon A Time In Mumbaai  – Pritam Chakraborty
 Raajneeti – Pritam, Aadesh Shrivastava, Shantanu Moitra, Wayne Sharpe
 Tees Maar Khan – Vishal–Shekhar
 2012 Rockstar – A. R. Rahman
 Delhi Belly – Ram Sampath
 Ra.One – Vishal–Shekhar
 The Dirty Picture – Vishal–Shekhar
 Zindagi Na Milegi Dobara – Shankar–Ehsaan–Loy
 2013 – (no award given)
 2014 Aashiqui 2 – Mithoon, Ankit Tiwari, Jeet Gannguli 
 Bhaag Milkha Bhaag – Shankar–Ehsaan–Loy
 Raanjhanaa – A. R. Rahman
 Goliyon Ki Raasleela Ram-Leela – Sanjay Leela Bhansali
 Yeh Jawaani Hai Deewani – Pritam Chakraborty
 2015 Highway – A. R. Rahman
 2 States – Shankar–Ehsaan–Loy
 Bang Bang! – Vishal–Shekhar
 CityLights – Jeet Gannguli
 Haider – Vishal Bhardwaj
 Humpty Sharma Ki Dulhania – Sachin–Jigar, Sharib-Toshi
 2016 Roy – Amaal Mallik, Ankit Tiwari, Meet Bros Anjjan
 Tamasha – A. R. Rahman
 Dilwale – Pritam Chakraborty
 Bajrangi Bhaijaan – Pritam Chakraborty
 Bajirao Mastani – Sanjay Leela Bhansali

See also
 Bollywood
 Cinema of India

References

Global Indian Music Academy Awards
Album awards